1964 may refer to:

The year 1964
1964 the Tribute, a Beatles tribute band
1964 (film), a 2015 American documentary film